Baptarma felicita is a species of moth of the family Noctuidae. It is found in North America, including California and Arizona.

The wingspan is about 22–24 mm.

External links
Images
Original description

Heliothinae